NA-11 Shangla is a constituency for the National Assembly of Pakistan. It covers tho whole of district Shangla. The constituency was formerly known as NA-31 (Shangla) from 1977 to 2018. The name changed to NA-10 (Shangla) after the delimitation in 2018 and NA-11 (Shangla) after the delimitation in 2022.

Members of Parliament

1977–2002: NA-31 Shangla

2002–2018: NA-31 Shangla

2018-2022: NA-10 Shangla

Elections since 2002

2002 general election

A total of 1,677 votes were rejected.

2008 general election

A total of 2,867 votes were rejected.

2013 general election

A total of 4,093 votes were rejected.

2018 general election 

General elections were held on 25 July 2018.

Contest overview
This constituency has been previously won by Ibadullah Khan in 2013 and his brother Amir Muqam in 2002 and 2008. Khan contested again on Pakistan Muslim League (N) ticket and won in 2018

Results

†JUI-F, and JI contested as part of MMA

See also
NA-10 Buner
NA-12 Kohistan-cum-Lower Kohistan-cum-Kolai Palas Kohistan

References

External links 
Election result's official website

10
10